Broderick Johnson is the co-founder and co-CEO of Alcon Entertainment, which he formed with his producing partner Andrew Kosove in 1997. Under his leadership, Alcon Entertainment has financed and produced and/or co-financed and co-produced over 30 films to date.

Early life
A native of Athens, Georgia, Johnson graduated from Sidney Lanier High School in Montgomery, Alabama in 1985. He met his current producing partner, Andrew Kosove, while the two attended Princeton University as undergraduates. Johnson majored in economics and initially pursued a career on Wall Street, accepting a position at Salomon Brothers in New York where he worked as a quantitative analyst in the equity derivatives group.

Career

Johnson and Kosove shared an appreciation for movies and an interest in filmmaking. After moving to Los Angeles and becoming involved with a low budget production, it was clear that their passion for film and background in finance could lead to a promising and viable career in the entertainment industry.

Shortly after their move, the two were introduced to FedEx Chairman and founder Frederick W. Smith. Johnson and Kosove presented Smith with a 221-page business plan for an independently financed film company that called for guaranteed distribution from a major studio, disciplined management of overhead, production, and marketing costs, and ownership of a film library.

Ultimately, Smith chose to partner with Johnson and Kosove in what became the current finance, development, and production company Alcon Entertainment. Since then, Alcon has established multiple exclusive long-term distribution agreements with Warner Bros.

Johnson's film producing credits include Blade Runner 2049, the sequel to the sci-fi classic starring Ryan Gosling, Harrison Ford, Jared Leto, Robin Wright, Ana de Armas, and Dave Bautista from Academy Award nominated director Denis Villeneuve; the Academy Award nominated Best Picture The Blind Side, which earned Sandra Bullock an Oscar for Best Actress; The Book of Eli starring Denzel Washington and Gary Oldman; Insomnia starring Al Pacino, Robin Williams, and Hilary Swank from director Christopher Nolan; The Sisterhood of the Traveling Pants; P.S. I Love You starring Hilary Swank; the critically acclaimed dramatic thriller Prisoners directed by Denis Villeneuve starring Hugh Jackman and Gyllenhaal; and the family hit Dolphin Tale starring Morgan Freeman and Harry Connick Jr.

Johnson earned an Emmy nomination in 2015 for producing the Alex Gibney directed HBO documentary Sinatra: All Or Nothing At All, an intimate documentary portrait of the singer, actor, father, husband, and philanthropist that attracted more viewers for HBO from the 50+ age bracket than ever before. His other television producing credits include the hit series The Expanse, a critically acclaimed space thriller for Syfy that was recently picked up by Amazon for another season; the HBO four-part documentary The Defiant Ones which chronicles the divergent roots and unlikely partnership of Dr. Dre and Jimmy Iovine; and the upcoming animated children's series Pete the Cat based on the best-selling books, which is a co-production currently in development with Amazon Studios to be streamed on Amazon.

In 2015, The Hollywood Reporter named Johnson on its "30 Most Powerful Film Producers in Hollywood”. In addition, Essence listed Johnson along with Will Smith and Tyler Perry in their 2009 “Power List of the Most Influential African American Agents, Producers, and Directors in Hollywood".

Personal life
Johnson lives in Los Angeles, California and is married to Jennifer Johnson. They have three children.

Filmography

Film

Television
Executive producer
 Hysteria (2014)
 Sinatra: All or Nothing at All (2015) (Documentary)
 Everest (2015)
 The Expanse (2015−22)
 The Defiant Ones (2017) (Documentary)
 Pete the Cat (2017−20)
 Nana (2019) (TV movie)
 Blade Runner: Black Lotus (2021)

References

External links
 

American film producers
Living people
Year of birth missing (living people)
Princeton University alumni
American independent film production company founders